Baldwin's Arcade in Hope, North Dakota was built in 1881.  It was listed on the National Register of Historic Places (NRHP) in 1975.

According to its NRHP nomination, it is "the oldest commercial building in the county" and "served as a
post office, bank, furniture store, funeral parlor, drug store, hardware store, and grocery at various times during its long years of service."

Steele County Museum
The building is now home to the Steele County Museum, operated by the Steele County Historical Society. The museum's collections include textiles, toy tractors, and a collection of artifacts from the Masons and Odd Fellows.

References

External links

 Steele County Museum - official site

Commercial buildings on the National Register of Historic Places in North Dakota
Commercial buildings completed in 1881
Museums in Steele County, North Dakota
History museums in North Dakota
National Register of Historic Places in Steele County, North Dakota
1881 establishments in Dakota Territory